The Invisible Boy (aka S.O.S Spaceship) is a 1957 black and white American science fiction film from Metro-Goldwyn Mayer, produced by Nicholas Nayfack, directed by Herman Hoffman, and starring Richard Eyer and Philip Abbott. It is the second film appearance of Robby the Robot, the science fiction character who "stole the show" in Forbidden Planet (1956), also released by Metro-Goldwyn-Mayer. According to an implied, subtle back story in The Invisible Boy, the robot is the same character as that in Forbidden Planet, which is set in the 23rd century; Robby is brought back to the film's mid-20th century era by time travel.

Plot
In 1957, ten-year-old Timmie Merrinoe (Richard Eyer) only wants a playmate. After a peculiar encounter with a supercomputer operated by his father's research lab, he is mysteriously invested with superior intelligence, and reassembles a robot that his father and other scientists had been ready to discard as irreparable junk. (It is explained that a vanished scientist claimed to have developed a time machine and retrieved the robot from the future—a photograph on the wall depicts the return to Earth of the space cruiser from "Forbidden Planet," and the arrival of "Robby the Robot.")  No one pays much attention to the robot after Timmie gets it operating again, until Timmie's mother becomes angry when her son is taken aloft by a huge powered kite that Robby has built at Timmie's urging (once Timmie, prompted by the supercomputer, has disabled Robby's programming to never endanger a human).

When Timmie expresses a wish to be able to play without being observed by his parents, Robby, with the aid of the supercomputer, makes him invisible. At first Timmie uses his invisibility to play simple pranks on his parents and others, but the mood soon changes when it becomes clear that the supercomputer is independent, ingenious, and evil. The supercomputer had manipulated Timmie into altering Robby's programming and, over many years, manipulated its creators into augmenting its intelligence. It can control Robby electronically, and later uses hypnosis and electronic implants to control human beings, along with intending to take over the world using a military weapons satellite. (It later declares its intent to destroy all life on Earth and then conquer the entire galaxy and exterminate any life that it contains, even bacteria.)  The supercomputer takes Timmie captive aboard the rocket; the army tries to stop Robby, but all of their artillery and weapons have no effect on him. Robby boards the ship, which promptly takes off. The supercomputer commands him to kill Timmie by slow surgical torture to coerce his parents. But Robby frees Timmie rather than listen to the supercomputer. Dr. Merrinoe tells Timmie and Robby to remain on board the ship as it has enough supplies for him to last a year. Instead, Timmie and Robby return to Earth.

Timmie and Dr. Merrinoe return to the lab to shut down the supercomputer, but it stops them. Robby then shows up and turns against the supercomputer, destroying its power source. Everything is back to normal we find the Merrinoes having a peaceful evening, Dr. Merrinoe is about to spank Timmie as punishment for ignoring him. He is however stopped by Robby (whose protective programming has been restored), and the film ends with a shot of the Merrinoes and Robby all having a peaceful evening together.

Cast
 Richard Eyer as Timmie Merrinoe
 Philip Abbott as Dr. Tom Merrinoe
 Diane Brewster as Mary Merrinoe
 Harold J. Stone as Gen. Swayne
 Robert H. Harris as Prof. Frank Allerton
 Dennis McCarthy as Col. Macklin
 Alexander Lockwood as Arthur Kelvaney
 John O'Malley as Prof. Baine
 Robby the Robot as Robby
 Gage Clarke as Dr. Bannerman
 Than Wyenn as Prof. Zeller
 Jefferson Searles as Prof. Foster (as Jefferson Dudley Searles)
 Alfred Linder as Martin / Computer
 Ralph Votrian as 1st Gate Sergeant
 Michael Miller as 2nd Gate Sergeant
 Marvin Miller as Robby the Robot (voice) (uncredited)

Reception
According to MGM records, the film earned $390,000 in the US and Canada and $450,000 elsewhere, for a total of $840,000. With a budget of $384,000 this resulted in a profit of $456,000.

Home media
The entire feature film appears as an extra on the Forbidden Planet 50th Anniversary DVD released in 2006 and on the Blu-ray released in 2010. Even on the Blu-ray, the film is in standard definition.

References

Further reading

External links
 
 
 
 

1957 films
1950s science fiction adventure films
1950s science fiction comedy films
American science fiction adventure films
American robot films
American science fiction comedy films
American comedy thriller films
Metro-Goldwyn-Mayer films
Films with screenplays by Cyril Hume
Films scored by Les Baxter
Films set in 1957
1957 comedy films
1950s English-language films
Films directed by Herman Hoffman
1950s American films